Robert Leon Jordan (born June 28, 1934) is a senior United States district judge of the United States District Court for the Eastern District of Tennessee.

Education and career

Born in Woodlawn, Tennessee, Jordan served in the United States Army from 1954 to 1956. He received a Bachelor of Science degree from the University of Tennessee in 1958 and a Juris Doctor from the University of Tennessee College of Law in 1960. He was in private practice in Nashville, Tennessee from 1960 to 1961. He was a manager for the Frontier Refining Company in Denver, Colorado from 1962 to 1964, returning to private practice in Johnson City, Tennessee from 1964 to 1966. He was thereafter a trust officer of the First People's Bank of Johnson City  until 1969, and then of First National Bank of Milton, Florida and of the Commercial National Bank of Pensacola, Florida (of which he was also a Vice President) until 1971. He resumed private practice in Johnson City from 1971 to 1980, and was a Chancellor of the First Judicial District of Tennessee from 1980 to 1988.

Federal judicial service

On July 25, 1988, Jordan was nominated by President Ronald Reagan to a seat on the United States District Court for the Eastern District of Tennessee vacated by Judge Robert Love Taylor. Jordan was confirmed by the United States Senate on October 14, 1988, and received his commission on October 17, 1988. He assumed senior status on November 30, 2001.

References

Sources
 

1934 births
Living people
Judges of the United States District Court for the Eastern District of Tennessee
United States district court judges appointed by Ronald Reagan
20th-century American judges
University of Tennessee alumni
University of Tennessee College of Law alumni
United States Army soldiers
People from Montgomery County, Tennessee
21st-century American judges